Valeriy Hoshkoderya (1 November 1959 – 13 March 2013) was a Ukrainian–Soviet professional football player and Ukrainian manager.

Valeriy had a son, Vitaliy Hoshkoderya.

External links
 
 Valeriy Hoshkoderya at 90minut (in Polish)

1959 births
2013 deaths
People from Svitlovodsk
Soviet footballers
Ukrainian footballers
FC Zirka Kropyvnytskyi players
FC SKA Rostov-on-Don players
FC Shakhtar Donetsk players
FC Shakhtar Makiivka players
FC Metalist-2 Kharkiv players
Stal Stalowa Wola players
Ukrainian expatriate footballers
Soviet expatriate footballers
Expatriate footballers in Poland
Ukrainian football managers
Association football defenders
Soviet expatriate sportspeople in Poland
Ukrainian expatriate sportspeople in Poland
Soviet Top League players
Sportspeople from Kirovohrad Oblast